Count George of Nassau-Beilstein, later also Count of Nassau-Dillenburg, (1 September 1562 – 9 August 1623 in Dillenburg) was the third son of Count John VI "the Elder" of Nassau-Dillenburg (1536-1606) from his first marriage with Landgravine Elisabeth of Leuchtenberg.

In 1576, he studied at the University of Heidelberg.  In 1578, he went to the Netherlands, to serve in the army, under Count of Günther XLI of Schwarzburg-Arnstadt.  While in the Netherlands, he tried to be elected Bishop of Utrecht, but failed.  From 1580, he attended the court of Margrave George Frederick of Brandenburg-Ansbach-Kulmbach.

In 1604, he purchased his first territory, the district and city of Driedorf from his father.  After his father died in 1606, George and his brothers decided to divide Nassau-Dillenburg.  When this division was implemented in 1607, William Louis received Nassau-Dillenburg; John VII received Nassau-Siegen; Ernst Casimir received Nassau-Diez; John Louis received Nassau-Hadamar and George received 
Nassau-Beilstein, which included the Lordships of Westerwald, Burbach and Hickengrund.  In 1611, he purchased the Nassau share of the district of Wehrheim, which Nassau shared with Trier, from his brother John VII.

Until 1612, George resided in Dillenburg, as regent for his absent brother William Louis, who was in Holland.  After his brother returned, George moved into Beilstein Castle, in his own territory.

In 1618, George reached an agreement with his brother John VII, in which John ceded to George the right to inherit Dillenburg if William Louis were to die childless.  This came to happen in 1620.  So George moved back to Dillenburg and became the founder of the younger Nassau-Dillenburg line.  Nassau-Beilstein was divided, with George keeping Burbach and Hickengrund.

He ruled his territory well; like his brothers he issued court regulations, administrative and law enforcement regulations.

George died in Dillenburg in 1623.

Marriage and issue 
George married twice.  His first wife was Anna Amalia of Nassau-Saarbrücken (1565-1605), the only child of Philip IV of Nassau-Weilburg.  They had 15 children:
 John Philip (b. 1586)
 Johan George (b. 1587)
 unnamed son (b. 1588)
 John Philip (1590-1607)
 George (1591-1616)
 Maria Juliana (1592-1645), married Count George II of Sayn-Wittgenstein-Berleburg (1565-1631), son of Louis I, Count of Sayn-Wittgenstein, and thus half-brother of her stepmother
 Louise (1593-1614)
 Louis Henry (1594-1662), Count of Nassau-Dillenburg jointly with Albert from 1623 to 1626 and alone from 1626 until his death; raised to Prince in 1654
 Wolfgang Philip (b. 1595)
 Albert (1596-1626), ruled Nassau-Dillenburg jointly with Louis Henry from 1623 until his death in 1626
 Amalia (1597-1598)
 Elisabeth (1598-1599)
 Erica (1600-1657)
 Anna Elisabeth (1602-1651)
 Maurice Louis (1603-1604)

After her death, George married Countess Amalia of Sayn-Wittgenstein (1585-1633), the daughter of Louis I, Count of Sayn-Wittgenstein.  With her, he had one more daughter:
 Margarethe (1606-1661), married Count Otto of Lippe-Brake (1589-1657), a son of Simon VI of Lippe (1554-1613)

Ancestors

References

External link

Counts of Nassau
House of Nassau
1562 births
1623 deaths
16th-century German people
17th-century German people